Shenzhen City Commercial Bank is a commercial bank based in Shenzhen in the People's Republic of China.

External links
 Official homepage

Banks of China
Banks established in 1995